N. D. "Wyck" Williams (born 1942 in Guyana) is a New York-based writer.

Biography
Born in Guyana, Williams went to Jamaica as a student to study at University of the West Indies at Mona in 1968. As a student he witnessed the riots following student demonstrations against the banning of the late Dr. Walter Rodney. This is now referred to as the Rodney riots, 1968. Williams writes of being powerfully influenced by the radical, nativist currents in Jamaican culture – reggae and yard theatre – of this period. His stories have been published in Jamaica Journal and Savacou, and in the anthologies One People's Grief (1983) and Best West Indian Stories.

In 1976 his first novel Ikael Torass was awarded the prestigious Casa de las Americas prize. It draws on his experiences in Jamaica and particularly the Rodney episode. He also explores the role of the university and education as an agent of social division, as well as the revolt on campus and in the wider society against the repressive forces in Jamaican society.

Williams lived for a time in Antigua, before moving to the U.S., where he lives in New York City. His works, from the short stories of The Crying of Rainbirds (1992), the novel, The Silence of Islands (1994), the two novellas My Planet of Ras and What Happening There, Prash in Prash and Ras (1997), to the short stories in Julie Mango (2003), all published by Peepal Tree Press, explore both an island and a diasporic experience.

In 2002 Williams published his searching look at the teeming underclass of New York in his disturbing novel Ah, Mikhail, O Fidel.

Two other collection of short stories followed: Colonial Cream in January 2003 and The Friendship of Shoes (November 2005).

Bibliography

 Ikael Torass, novel (1976)
 The Crying of Rainbirds, short stories (1992)
 The Silence of Islands, novel (1994)
 Prash and Ras (1997)
 Julie Mango, short stories (2003)
 Colonial Cream, short stories (2003)
 The Friendship of Shoes, short stories (2005)

References

University of the West Indies alumni
Guyanese writers
1942 births
Living people